Xue Fei is a Chinese host and educator.

Biography
After graduating from Communication University of China in 1982, he was assigned to China Central Television to host Xinwen Lianbo.

Xue was forced to resign for expressing sympathy when he reported the 1989 Tiananmen Square protests with Li Ruiying on June 5, 1989.

In 1992, Xue settled in Hungary.

Xue returned to China in 2001, he is now the President of the Department of Broadcasting, China Women's University and Beijing Culture and Arts School,

Works

Television
 Xinwen Lianbo (1982–1989)

See also
 Tian'anmen Square protests of 1989

References

Communication University of China alumni
CCTV newsreaders and journalists
Living people
Year of birth missing (living people)